John Ford was an American football coach. He served as the fifth head football coach at Marquette University during the 1905 and 1906 seasons. His coaching record at Marquette was 4–8–2. This ranks him 13th at Marquette in total wins and 15th at Marquette in winning percentage (.393). Having been a graduate of the College of the Holy Cross (where he played football), Ford was also the first paid coach at Marquette.

Head coaching record

References

Year of birth missing
Year of death missing
Place of birth missing
Place of death missing
Holy Cross Crusaders football players
Marquette Golden Avalanche football coaches